In Black and White (subtitled On Tour...Ann Arbor/NYC) is a live album by multi-instrumentalist Joe McPhee's Trio X featuring bassist Dominic Duval and percussionist Jay Rosen recorded in Ann Arbor, Michigan in 1999 and at the Vision Festival in NYC in 2001 and released on the Cadence Jazz label in 2002.

Reception

Allmusic reviewer Steve Loewy states "When they are "on," the members of Trio X play music that is as good as it gets, and evidence of that is amply abundant here, with some important and exciting interpretations".

Track listing 
All compositions by Joe McPhee, Domenic Duval and Jay Rosen except as indicated
 "Intro: God Bless the Child" (Billie Holiday, Arthur Herzog, Jr.) - 7:55
 "'Round Midnight and Later" - 13:59
 "Going Home" (Antonín Dvořák) - 8:16 		
 "Blood at the Root"  - 16:35
 "Sida's Song"  - 17:54
 "Wait Until Evening" - 8:01

Personnel 
Joe McPhee - saxophone
Dominic Duval - bass
Jay Rosen - drums, percussion

References 

Trio X live albums
2002 live albums
Cadence Jazz Records live albums